Winnie-the-Pooh: The Best Bear in All the World is the second authorised sequel to A. A. Milne's original Winnie-the-Pooh stories. It was published on 6 October 2016 to mark the 90th anniversary of the publication of the first Winnie-the-Pooh book. The sequel is an anthology of four short stories, each written by a leading children's author. The four contributors are Paul Bright, Jeanne Willis, Kate Saunders, and Brian Sibley. The illustrations, in the style of the originals by E. H. Shepard, are by Mark Burgess. The book attracted national press coverage because of the introduction of a new character, Penguin.

Plot
Each of the stories is devoted to one of the seasons in the Hundred Acre Wood, opening with "Autumn" by Paul Bright. Christopher Robin is excited to be appearing as St George in the village play, but he alarms Pooh and Piglet with talk of a dragon. Meanwhile, Eeyore is possessively guarding Something Interesting, but is it something AD or something BC? With so many questions to ask what can the friends do when Christopher Robin has asked not to be disturbed?

"Winter" by Brian Sibley introduces a new character, Penguin. Christopher Robin says Penguin needs Bringing Out of Himself. But will Penguin stay long enough for the friends to get to know him?

In "Spring" by Jeanne Willis, the birds are nesting and Winnie-the-Pooh is admiring the daffodils and humming to himself when he encounters Eeyore feeling gloomy because he is convinced that another donkey is after his thistles. Pooh sets out to find this other donkey and Piglet agrees to help as long as the other donkey is not a Heffalump.

In "Summer" by Kate Saunders, Christopher Robin tells Winnie-the-Pooh all about the Sauce of the Nile, which makes Pooh wonder if the river in the Hundred Acre Wood also has its own sauce so he sets off with Piglet, Rabbit, Tigger and the others to find out.

The new character
Shortly before publication it was announced that The Best Bear in All the World would introduce a new character to the Hundred Acre Wood in the form of Penguin. The Guardian reports how author Brian Sibley was inspired to create the character by a photograph of A. A. Milne's son, Christopher (the real Christopher Robin), with a toy penguin. Sibley said, "For me, the challenge was more than just attempting to play A. A. Milne in his own literary game. I also wanted to find a way of successfully introducing a brand new character into Pooh's world, whilst being sympathetic to the tone and style of the original books. The thought of Pooh encountering a penguin seemed no more outlandish than his meeting a kangaroo and a tiger in a Sussex wood, so I started thinking about what might have happened if, on a rather snowy day, Penguin had found his way to Pooh Corner." [[stylist (magazine)|The Stylist]] reports that Penguin is the first new character to be authorised by the Milne estate. The Independent reports that the original penguin toy is also thought to have been bought at Harrods. "The toy department where Mrs.Milne bought the iconic bear hosted a huge array of stuffed animals," said Harrods archivist Sebastian Wormell. "In the early years of the 20th century, toy penguins soared in popularity as the exploits of Antarctic explorers such as Shackleton and Scott fascinated the public. We believe that the toy pictured could be Squeak, which originated in our 1922 catalogue and came from Pip, Squeak and Wilfred, a popular cartoon-strip."

 Other sequels 

This is the second authorised sequel to Milne's original stories. The first, Return to the Hundred Acre Wood was written by David Benedictus and also illustrated by Mark Burgess. This also introduced a new character, Lottie the Otter. Another special adventure was conceived for Pooh's 90th birthday, Winnie-the-Pooh Meets the Queen'', in which Pooh visits Buckingham Palace for the occasion of Queen Elizabeth II's 90th birthday.

References

2016 children's books
Winnie-the-Pooh books
British children's books
Books about bears
Pigs in literature
Books about tigers
Books about penguins
Egmont Books books